The following highways are numbered 352:

Canada
Manitoba Provincial Road 352
Newfoundland and Labrador Route 352
Prince Edward Island Route 352
 Quebec Route 352

India
 National Highway 352 (India)

Japan
 Japan National Route 352

United States
  Arkansas Highway 352
  Georgia State Route 352
  Indiana State Road 352
  Maryland Route 352
 New York:
  New York State Route 352
 New York State Route 352 (former)
 County Route 352 (Albany County, New York)
  Pennsylvania Route 352
  Puerto Rico Highway 352
  Tennessee State Route 352
  Texas State Highway 352
  Virginia State Route 352
  Wyoming Highway 352